Hanna Emilia Rydberg-Mitiku, known simply as Emilia (born 5 January 1978), is a Swedish pop music and soul singer. Her 1998 hit single "Big Big World" reached number one in the music charts in several countries.

Life and career
Rydberg's father is the Ethiopian popular singer Teshome Mitiku. Her mother is Swedish, Malena Rydberg. As a student she attended the Adolf Fredrik's Music School in Stockholm.

Rydberg was discovered in 1996 by Lars Anderson, son of ABBA's manager, Stig Anderson. She used the mononym of Emilia in the first years of her career, but more recently she has started to perform under the name of Emilia Mitiku, using her father's surname. In 2009, she competed in Melodifestivalen, the Swedish national selection for Eurovision Song Contest, with the song "You're My World". She advanced directly from her heat; however, she placed ninth in the final. She released her album My World in 2009. Her single "Teardrops" was released to radio stations on 2 June 2009.

Emilia recorded a cover version of Rihanna's "We Found Love" for a studio session in Stockholm which was published on YouTube. On 25 June 2012 she released the single "Lost Inside".

Discography

Albums

Singles

Featured in
2010/2012: "Watch the Stars" (Bryan Rice featuring Emilia) (BEL (Vl): #91)

References

External links
Emilia Mitiku - Official YouTube channel
Profile at rateyourmusic.com

Emilia Mitiku – Booking and events

1978 births
Living people
Swedish pop singers
Swedish people of Ethiopian descent
Singers from Stockholm
Swedish soul singers
21st-century Swedish singers
21st-century Swedish women singers
English-language singers from Sweden
Melodifestivalen contestants of 2009